Cross River State is a state in the South-South geopolitical zone of Nigeria. Named for the Cross River, the state was formed from the eastern part of the Eastern Region on 27 May 1967. Its capital is Calabar, it borders to the north through Benue state, to the west through Ebonyi state and Abia state, and to the southwest through Akwa Ibom state, while its eastern border forms part of the national border with Cameroon. Originally known as the South-Eastern State before being renamed in 1976, Cross River state formerly included the area that is now Akwa Ibom state, which became a distinct state in 1987.

Of the 36 states in Nigeria, Cross River state is the nineteenth largest in area and 27th most populous, with an estimated population of over 3.8 million as of 2016. Geographically, the state is mainly divided between the Guinean forest–savanna mosaic in the far north and the Cross–Sanaga–Bioko coastal forests in the majority of the interior of the state. The smaller ecoregions are the Central African mangroves in the coastal far south and a part of the montane Cameroonian Highlands forests in the extreme northeast. The most major geographical feature is the state's namesake, the Cross River, which bisects the state's interior before forming much of the state's western border, and flowing into the Cross River Estuary. Other important rivers are the Calabar and Great Kwa rivers, which flow from the inland Oban Hills, before flanking the city of Calabar and flowing into the Cross River Estuary as well. In the forested interior of the state are several biodiverse protected areas including the Cross River National Park, Afi Mountain Wildlife Sanctuary, and Mbe Mountains Community Forest. These wildlife reserves contain populations of Preuss's red colobus, African forest buffalo, bat hawk, tree pangolin, grey-necked rockfowl, and West African slender-snouted crocodile, along with some of Nigeria's last remaining Nigeria-Cameroon chimpanzee, drill, African forest elephant, and Cross River gorilla populations.

Modern-day Cross River state has been inhabited by several ethnic groups for hundreds of years, primarily the Efik of the riverside south and Calabar; the Ekoi (Ejagham) of the inland south; the Akunakuna, Boki, Bahumono, and Yakö (Yakurr) of the central region; and the Bekwarra,
Ogoja, Bette, Igede, Ukelle (Kukele) of the northern region. In the pre-colonial period, what is now Cross River state was divided between its ethnic groups with some joining the Aro Confederacy, while the Efik founded the Akwa Akpa (Old Calabar) city-state. The latter become a British protectorate in 1884, as the capital of the Oil Rivers Protectorate; but it was in the early 1900s that the Britons gained formal control of the entire area. Around the same time, the protectorate (now renamed the Niger Coast Protectorate) was incorporated into the Southern Nigeria Protectorate, which later merged into British Nigeria. After the merger, much of the modern-day Cross River state has become a center of anti-colonial resistance during the Women's War and trade, through the international seaport at Calabar.

After independence in 1960, the area now regarded as Cross River state was a part of the post-independence Eastern Region until 1967, when the region was split and the area became part of the South-Eastern state. Less than two months afterwards, the Igbo-majority of the former Eastern Region attempted to secede as the state of Biafra; in the three-year long Nigerian Civil War. Calabar and its port was hard-fought over in Operation Tiger Claw, while the people from Cross River state were persecuted by the Biafran forces as they were mainly non-Igbos. At the war's end and the reunification of Nigeria, the South-Eastern state was reformed until 1976, when it was renamed Cross River state. Eleven years later, Cross River state was divided with western Cross River being broken off to form the new Akwa Ibom state. The state formerly contained the oil-producing Bakassi Peninsula, but it was ceded to Cameroon under the terms of the Greentree Agreement.

As an agricultural state, the Cross River state's economy partially relies on crops, such as cocoyam, rubber, oil palm, yam, cocoa, cashews, and plantain crops, along with fishing. Key minor industries involve tourism in and around the wildlife reserves along with the historic Ikom Monoliths site, Calabar Carnival, and Obudu Mountain Resort. Cross River state has the joint-thirteenth highest Human Development Index in the country and numerous institutions of tertiary education.

Geography
Cross River state derives its name from the Cross River, which passes through the state. It is a coastal state located in the Niger Delta region, and occupies 20,156 square kilometers. It shares boundaries with Benue state to the north, Ebonyi and Abia states to the west, to the east by Sud-Ouest Province in Cameroon, and to the south by Akwa-Ibom and the Atlantic Ocean. The state is made up of 18 Local Government Area Councils.

Climate 
Like few other Nigerian states, the climate of Cross River state is tropical. Not only this, the state is characterised with relative humidity. The average temperature of the state is between 150C and 300C. However, this climatic condition is different in locations within the Cross River state such as the high plateau of Obudu, which has a record of  a fall in temperature between 40C and 100C, as a result of the high altitude of this area. The capital city of the State, Calabar, has a significant record of rainfall within the year, while the dry season has less significant effect in the state due to the depth of rainfall experienced. Based on the records presented by the Climate Data of the state, the annual rainfall of Cross River state is 3306mm| 130.2 inch.

History 
Cross River as a south-south state was created on 27 May 1967 from the former Eastern Region, Nigeria, by the General Yakubu Gowon regime. Its name was changed to Cross River state in the 1976 state creation exercise by the then General Murtala Mohammed regime from South Eastern State.The present day Akwa Ibom State was excised from it in the state creation exercise of September 1987 by the then regime of General Ibrahim Babangida. The struggle for a new state creation started in 1980 in the reign of president shehu shagari where Senator Joseph Oqua Ansa (Mon) the senator representing Calabar senatorial district then was at the helm of affairs. Its capital is Calabar. Its major towns are Calabar Municipality, Akamkpa, Biase, Calabar South, Ikom, Igede, Obubra, Odukpani, Ogoja, Bekwarra, Ugep, Obudu, Obanliku, Akpabuyo, Ofutop, Iso-bendghe, Danare, Boki, Yala, Bendeghe Ekiem, Etomi, Ediba, Itigidi, Ugep, Ukpe and Ukelle.

The state has many governors and administrators including Udoakaha J. Esuene, Paul Omu, Tunde Elegbede, Clement Isong, Donald Etiebet, Daniel Archibong, Ibim Princewill, Ernest Atta, Clement Ebri, Ibrahim Kefas, Gregory Agboneni, Umar Faoruk Ahmed, Christopher Osondu, Donald Duke, Liyel Imoke and Benedict Ayade. The Current Governor is Benedict Ayade, who was sworn into office on 29 May 2015. He was re-elected for a second term in office in 2019 under the platform of The People's Democratic Party.

Demographics

The State is composed of several ethnic groups, which include the Efik, the Ejagham, Yakurr, Bahumono, Bette, Yala, Igede, Ukelle and the Bekwarra among others. There are four major languages spoken in the state: English, the common language, Efik, Bekwarra, and Ejagham. The Efik language is widely spoken in Cross River State, especially in Calabar Municipality, Calabar South, Akpabuyo, Bakassi, Akampkpa, Biase, and Odukpani Local Government Areas.  The Ejagham language is also widely spoken language in Cross River State.

The Efik-speaking people live mainly in the Southern senatorial districts of Cross River, or as it is commonly referred to, the Greater Calabar district, which includes Calabar Municipality,  Calabar South, Bakassi, Biase, Akpabuyo, Odukpani, and Akamkpa LGAs. There is also the Qua community in Calabar, which speaks Ejagham. The main Ejagham group occupies mostly the Greater Calabar areas of Calabar Municipality, Odukpani, Biase and Akampkpa sections of Cross River State.

There are also the Yakurr /Agoi/Bahumono ethnic groups in Yakurr and Abi LGA, while the Mbembe are predominantly found in Obubra LGA. Further up the core northern part of the state are several sub-dialectical groups, among which are Etung, Olulumo, Ofutop, Nkim/Nkum, Abanajum, Nseke and Boki in both Ikom, Etung and Boki LGAs. Also, the Yala/Yache, Igede, Ukelle, Ekajuk, Mbube, Bette, Bekwarra and Utukwang people are found in Ogoja, Yala, Obudu and Obanliku and Bekwarra LGA's. The Yala are a subgroup of the Idoma nation, part of the Yala LGA's subgroups are the Igede speaking people believed to have migrated from the Oju part of Benue State, who migrated from Ora, in Edo North.

In Cross River North, Bekwarra is one of the most widely spoken language. It is understood by other tribes in the district. This language along with Efik and Ejagham is used for news broadcast in the state owned radio and TV stations.

Cross River State epitomises the nation's linguistic and cultural plurality and it is important to note that, in spite of the diversity of dialects, all the indigenous languages in the state have common linguistic roots as Niger–Congo languages.
Finally, the State serves as the venue of the largest carnival in Africa.

Local Government Areas

Cross River State consists of eighteen (18) Local Government Areas. They are:

 Abi
 Akamkpa
 Akpabuyo
 Bekwarra
 Bakassi
 Biase
 Boki
 Calabar Municipal
 Calabar South
 Etung
 Ikom
 Obanliku
 Obubra
 Obudu
 Odukpani
 Ogoja
 Yakurr
 Yala

Languages
Languages of Cross River State listed by LGA includes :

Other languages spoken in Cross State are Eki, Ibibio, Ilue, Ito, and Okobo.

Festivals

Festivals held in Cross River state includes:

The Cross River State Christmas Festival – 1 December to 31 December annually
The Cross River State Carnival Float – 26 and 27 December yearly
The Yakurr Leboku Yam festival – 28 August annually
The Calabar Boat Regata
Anong Bahumono Festival which is held in Anong Village, during which different cultural dances are showcased, including Ikpobin (acclaimed to be the most entertaining dance in the state), Ekoi, Obam, Emukei and Eta
Ediba Bahumono Festival which is held in Ediba Village every last Saturday in the month of July
Bekwarra, Obudu, Obanliku, Igede New yam festival which is held every 1st Saturday of September every year.

Tourism

From the soaring plateaus of the mountain tops of Obanliku to the Rain forests of Afi, from the Waterfalls of Agbokim and Kwa to the spiralling ox-bow Calabar River which provides sights and images of the Tinapa Business Resort, Calabar Marina, Calabar Residency Museum and the Calabar Slave Park along its course, there is always a thrilling adventure awaiting the eco-tourist visiting Cross River State.

Other tourist attractions are the Ikom Monoliths (a series of volcanic-stone monoliths of unknown age), the Mary Slessor Tomb, Calabar Drill Monkey Sanctuary, Cross River National Park, Afi Mountain walkway canopy, Kwa falls, Agbokim waterfalls, Tinapa Business Resort, Mono rail way and the annual Calabar Carnival that takes place during the Christmas period.

Cross River State can be accessed by air through the Margaret Ekpo International Airport at Calabar. There are daily flights to Calabar from Lagos and Abuja serviced by airlines such as Air peace Airlines, Ibom Air Airlines and recently Cally Air, operated by Aero Contractors which worked for about 5 months in 2021 and at the start of 2022, it stopped operation. Reason is still unknown.

Education

Education started with mother tongue education. Presently, a lot of schools in the state for educative learning in the society. The Tertiary educational institutions in the State includes:

 University of Calabar, 
 Cross River State University of Technology
 College of Health Technology, Calabar
 Ibrahim Babangida College of Agriculture, Obubra
 Cross River State College of Education located, Akamkpa 
 Federal College of Education, Obudu 
 Technical College Ugep, Yakurr
 Arthur Jarvis University, Akpabuyo

Politics
The state government is led by a democratically elected governor who works closely with members of the state house of assembly. The capital city of the state is Calabar

Electoral System

The governor of each state is selected using a modified two-round system. To be elected in the first round, a candidate must receive the plurality of the vote and over 25% of the vote in at least two -third of the State local government Areas. If no candidate passes threshold, a second round will be held between the top candidate and the next candidate to have received a plurality of votes in the highest number of local government Areas.

See also
Tinapa Resort
Akwa Akpa
Cross River language

References

External links
 Cross River State Government website
 http://crossriverwatch.com/?p=25473

 
States of Nigeria
States and territories established in 1967
Coasts of Nigeria
French-speaking countries and territories